Wilhelm Maria Hubertus Leibl (October 23, 1844 – December 4, 1900) was a German realist painter of portraits and scenes of peasant life.

Biography
Leibl was born in Cologne, where his father was the director of the Cathedral choir.  He was apprenticed to a locksmith before beginning his artistic training with the local painter Hermann Becker in 1861. He entered the Munich Academy in 1864, subsequently studying with several artists including Carl Theodor von Piloty. He set up a group studio in 1869, with Johann Sperl, Theodor Alt, and Rudolf Hirth du Frênes. At about the same time, Gustave Courbet visited Munich to exhibit his work, making a considerable impression on many of the local artists by his demonstrations of alla prima painting directly from nature. Leibl's paintings, which already reflected his admiration for the Dutch old masters, became looser in style, their subjects rendered with thickly brushed paint against dark backgrounds.

Career
In 1869, following Courbet's suggestion,  Leibl went to Paris, where he was introduced to Édouard Manet, but was forced to return to Germany in 1870, due to the outbreak of the Franco-Prussian War.  In 1873 Leibl left Munich for the isolated Bavarian countryside, where he depicted the local peasants in everyday scenes devoid of sentimentality or anecdote. The sketchlike quality of his earlier paintings was replaced by greater precision and attention to drawing. Living from 1878 to 1882 in Berbling, he painted perhaps his best-known work, the Three Women in Church (Kunsthalle, Hamburg). Its intensely realistic style recalls Hans Holbein in its clarity of definition. During the following years he moved to the town of Bad Aibling and, in 1892, to Kutterling, as his paintings united the disciplined drawing he had adopted in the 1880s with a new delicacy and luminosity.

Leibl painted without preliminary drawing, setting to work directly with color, an approach that has parallels to Impressionism. His commitment to the representation of reality as the eye sees it earned him recognition in his lifetime as the preeminent artist of a group known as the Leibl-Kreis (Leibl Circle) that included, among others, Carl Schuch, Wilhelm Trübner, Otto Scholderer, and Hans Thoma.

During the first half of the 1870s, Leibl executed a series of 19 etchings in a meticulous style. His charcoal drawings are conceived in great masses of light and shadow, blocked in as though he were using a brush and paint.

He visited the Netherlands in 1898, and his work was included in the Berlin Secession exhibition the following year. He died in Würzburg in 1900.

Nazi-looted art
In 2009 the German Advisory Commission for the Return of Cultural Property Seized as a Result of Nazi Persecution recommended that Leibl's painting “Bauernmädchen ohne Hut mit weißem Halstuch” (‘Peasant Girl without a Hat and with a White Headcloth’) (1897), which had been seized by the Nazis, be restituted to the heirs of Dr. Alexander Lewin.

Notes

References
German Masters of the Nineteenth Century: Paintings and Drawings from the Federal Republic of Germany. Catalogue of an exhibition held at the Metropolitan Museum of Art, New York,  1981. Free download available.
Forster-Hahn, Françoise (2001). Spirit of an Age: Nineteenth-Century Paintings From the Nationalgalerie, Berlin. London: National Gallery Company. 

Ruhmer, Eberhard, and Wilhelm Leibl (1984). Der Leibl-Kreis und die reine Malerei. Rosenheim: Rosenheimer Verlagshaus.  (German language)

External links
German masters of the nineteenth century: paintings and drawings from the Federal Republic of Germany, a full text exhibition catalog from The Metropolitan Museum of Art, which contains material on Wilhelm Leibl (no. 41–43)

1844 births
1900 deaths
19th-century German painters
19th-century German male artists
German male painters
Realist painters
Academy of Fine Arts, Munich alumni
Artists from Cologne
Munich School